Rose Greene (1946 – July 11, 2019) was an American activist and financial planner based on Los Angeles. She is remembered for organizing and launching a major fundraiser for HIV/AIDS care, the California AIDS Ride, a 545-mile bike ride along the coast of California.

Early life and education 
Rose Greene was born in Los Angeles. Her father owned a cement company. Her mother died when she was a girl. Greene graduated from Fairfax High School in 1964, and then earned a bachelor of fine arts at California State University, Northridge. She pursued further studies in finance at the University of Southern California.

Career 
Greene taught high school briefly, and became a financial planner who specialized in advising clients and non-profit organizations in the gay and lesbian community. She served as co-chair of the board of directors of the Los Angeles LGBT Center from 1989 to 1995, and from 2006 to 2011. “I watched her become more and more of a leader, more and more of an advocate for the Center, and more and more outspoken and militant,” recalled Torie Osborn, the executive director of the Center. In 1992, Greene chaired the search committee for Osborn's successor, the Center's current executive director, Lorri Jean. 

Greene headed the capital campaign for the Center's headquarters in the McDonald/Wright Building in Hollywood, opened in 1992, and oversaw development of the Center's Jeffrey Goodman Special Care Clinic, opened in 1993. She organized the first California AIDS Ride in 1994, a seven-day bicycle tour of the California coast from San Francisco to Los Angeles. The Ride has been a major successful fundraiser for HIV/AIDS research, prevention, and care in the decades since, and a model for similar events elsewhere. It is now known as the AIDS/LifeCycle.

Personal life 
Greene was a founding member of Congregation Kol Ami in West Hollywood. She married Helena Ruffin in 2008. Greene died from bone cancer in 2019, in Duarte, California, aged 72 years.

References

External links 

 Dan Pallotta (July 18, 2019). "The World Needs More Rose Greenes", a blog post in tribute to Greene, by a fellow activist
 "Community" at Rose Greene Financial (her professional website)

1946 births
2019 deaths
Fairfax High School (Los Angeles) alumni
California State University, Northridge alumni
University of Southern California alumni
American financial businesspeople
HIV/AIDS activists
American LGBT rights activists
LGBT people from California
LGBT Jews
20th-century American LGBT people
American Reform Jews
Activists from Los Angeles
Women in finance
20th-century American businesswomen
20th-century American businesspeople
21st-century American businesswomen
21st-century American businesspeople
Businesspeople from Los Angeles
Deaths from cancer in California
Deaths from bone cancer